Farfan (also Romanized as Fārfān; also known as Fārfāān and Pārfūn) is a village in Rudasht-e Sharqi Rural District, Bon Rud District, Isfahan County, Isfahan Province, Iran. At the 2006 census, its population was 1,497, in 425 families.

References 

Populated places in Isfahan County